Hans Peter Richter  (1925–1993) was a German author. He was born in Cologne, Germany, went to school in Germany, studied at the university of Hannover, and graduated in 1968. He also spent some of his life in the German army. Richter wrote many books for children and young adults. Notable among them is the novel Friedrich (in German ), about the persecution of Jews in Germany during The Holocaust. Friedrich (published in 1970) was the subject of an American Library Association 1972 ALSC Batchelder Award.

Some of his most notable books are:
 The Time of the Young Soldiers
 I Was There
 Friedrich
He also published several books on sociology and psychology.

Hans Peter Richter was married to Elfried Feldman and had four children; Ulrike, Claudia, Leonore, and Gereon. He died in Mainz in November 1993.

References
 Richter, Hans P. Friedrich, trans. Edite Kroll. New York City, New York: Puffin Books, 1970. .
 Outline of Friedrich, Reading Matters, UK

External links
 
 Autor bei dtv

1925 births
1993 deaths
German children's writers
Writers from Cologne
People from the Rhine Province
20th-century German novelists
German male novelists
20th-century German male writers